River to Cross or Rivers to Cross may refer to:
 Many Rivers to Cross, a song by Jimmy Cliff
 One More River to Cross: Black and Gay in America, a 1996 book by Keith Boykin